Dadeumi or Dadeumijil or Kinuta (Japanese: ) is a Korean traditional ironing method where two women knelt on the floor, facing each other across a smoothing stone, beating out a rhythm on the cloth to press out its wrinkles and soften it. 

Dadeumi requires Dadeumitbangmang-i and Dadeumitdol (다듬잇돌). The former is a bat that pounds on the cloth, and the latter is the stone under the cloth.

Also, the cloth is wrapped in a thick round bat, Hongdooggae (Korean: 홍두깨) (wooden roller used in smoothing cloth)', and Dadeumi is performed. It is used to trim a thin cloth such as ramie fabric or silk.

History 
The 18th-century book, Gyuhap chongseo, details how to do Dadeumi and care for fabrics. It is estimated that it would have been used from the 17th to the 18th century. Since ancient times, in Korea, people thought it was a good three sounds to hear the crying of baby, reading a book, and the Dadeumi sound. These three sounds are called Samhuiseong. It is because the cheerful sound when doing Dadeumi remind people of healthy vitality, the diligence and stability of everyday life.

Form and characteristics 
Dadeumitdol is made of granite, agalmatolite, marble, etc., and it is also made of solid wood such as birch wood or zelkova. It was made from birch wood in Chungcheongdo or Hamgyeongdo, and in this case it was called the Dadeumitdae (다듬잇대). The shape is a thick rectangle. The upper surface touching the fabric is made to be slightly wider and smoother than the underside so that the fabric does not hurt. There are four short legs on the four corners of the underside, and both of side have grooves for carrying. It is also called Chimseok (Hanja: , Hangul: 침석). Dadeumitbangmang-i is a pair of two, made of wood.

Method 

First, women dry the starched clothes. Then, women make the clothes wet with water by spraying it with mouth or hand. Women fold the laundry soaked in water into the wrapping cloth, wait until the water spreads evenly, then fold it back. After that, women place the laundry wrapped in a cloth on top of the Dadeumitdol and beat it with a Dadeumitbangmang-i. When there is one person, grab a bat in both hands and beat. When there are two people, sit face to face with the Dadeumitdol in the middle. After a certain amount of beat, repeat unfolding and folding, wrinkles of clothes spread and shine. Fabric such as fine silk is arranged on the Dadeumitdol in the primary, then wrap it in Hongdooggae and beat it.

Social and cultural significance 
Korean did dadeumi in late autumn and winter. Until late at night, the sound of two people tapping the cloth to the tone with four bats was one aspect of Korean customs. Dadeumi also meant correcting the mind to the white-clad folk. In other words, it is sometimes referred to as an Ingochim (Hanja: ,), which means that the pain of the heart that is too much to bear is tolerated with the Dadeumi. Each Dadeumitdol has a different tone. Because there is a favorite sound in each area, it is carved to make a unique sound like a percussion instrument. There are also colorful paintings and colored Dadeumitdol, and there are also Dadeumitdol with details of the dead. It was a reflection of the preference and culture of the time. Dadeumi was also useful for making cloth for windbreak. When making the hanbok, starched clothes and did dadeumi, the fibers spread and the starched clothes well so that the wind could be blocked well. Furthermore, the surface became less dirty because it became smooth and it was easy to wash because the dirt was falling well. In modern times, the range used in everyday life is reduced, but Dadeumi performances are performed at festivals.

Dadeumi in culture 
There are Korean cultures related to Dadeumi. Sound of Dadeumi is a poem by Muae Yangjudong that depicts the lives and feelings of women who do Dadeumi. Yangpyeong folk song (양평민요) expresses a woman who does Dadeumi in simple language. There is also Dadeumi Nori who competes to do better Dadeumi.

Sound of Dadeumi-Muae Yangjudong 
Sound of Dadeumi-Muae Yangjudong (Korean:  (1903년))

A Dademi sound of a neighbor.

The deeper the night, the more it gets.

It is pretty sleepy,

but it does not stop even if the cock crows.

If the good women talk about housework

and make their husbands' winter clothes carefully,

the body will be busy but the heart will be happy.

But in a difficult life,

aren't they beating on other people's silk clothes overnight,

whether their clothes are worn out or bare.

Yangpyeong folk song 
Yangpyeong folk song (Korean: 양평민요)

Dadimi* Dadimi,

Yeon-Dadimi.

Playing over the shoulder.

Bakdal-bakmaeng* have an fortunate destiny,

so goes around on big baby's wrist.

(* Dadimi = dialect of Dadeumi)

(* Bakdal-bakmaeng= A bat made of birch wood)

Dadeumi Nori 
Dadeumi Nori(Korean:) is a play performed in Namwon city, Jeollabuk-do. The women sat face to face with the dadeumitdol in the middle and contested who was better at Dadeumi. The two people who sit facing each other change the method of fulling according to the pitch of the sound. It removes the boredom of Dadeumi. With the way of washing and the material of the cloth changed in the modern day, it is now rarely played.

Chinese poetry 
Bai Juyi made 聞夜砧.

See also
Waulking song, Scottish folksongs sung by women as the worked cloth together
Fulling, the pounding of woollen cloth

References

External links 

South Korean culture
Laundry equipment
Hand tools
Japanese culture
Gendered occupations